Paul Momirovski (born 19 July 1996) is an Australian rugby league footballer who plays as a  and er for the Sydney Roosters in the NRL. 

He previously also played for the Sydney Roosters, before playing for the Wests Tigers, Melbourne Storm and Penrith Panthers  in the National Rugby League. In season 2020 he was on loan to Melbourne in the NRL. The arrangement between Wests and the Storm to trade Momirovski with Harry Grant for the 2020 NRL season was the first loan arrangement in National Rugby League history.

He played at representative level for the Prime Minister's XIII and is a premiership winning player of 2021.

Background
Momirovski was born in Sydney and is of Macedonian descent. 

He played his junior football for the Alexandria Rovers and played for the South Sydney SG Ball and Harold Matthews sides before signing with the Sydney Roosters in 2014. He Co-Captained the Roosters’ SG Ball side to a premiership in 2014.

Playing career

2016
Paul played in the Sydney Roosters’ Holden Cup side from 2014 to 2016. Momirovski playing in the halves in the Sydney Roosters’ 2016 Holden Cup premiership winning team.

2017
Momirovski made his Intrust Super Premiership debut in round 1 of the 2017 Intrust Super Premiership vs Western Suburbs Magpies, playing at centre. Momirovski played 20 games in the season, scoring 5 tries, kicking 15 goals, and 1 match-winning field goal.

2018
Momirovski made his debut for the Sydney Roosters in round 18 vs the Gold Coast Titans, scoring a try. Momirovski played in the Roosters' Preliminary Final win against the South Sydney Rabbitohs, scoring a try. He was originally named in the Roosters squad for the 2018 NRL Grand Final, but he did not play due to Cooper Cronk returning to the squad shifting him to the reserves. Momirovski signed with the Wests Tigers for the 2019 season.

2019
Momirovski made his debut for Wests against Manly-Warringah in round 1 which ended in a 20–6 victory at Leichhardt Oval.  In Round 21 against Canterbury-Bankstown at ANZ Stadium, Momirovski scored 2 tries and had the chance to send the match into extra-time with a kick at goal as Wests crossed over in the final minute to make the score 18–16.  Momirovski subsequently missed his conversion attempt after the full time siren had sounded and Canterbury held on to win the match. 

In round 24 against the St George-Illawarra Dragons, Momirovski kicked all seven of his attempts at goal and scored three tries in the 42–14 win at the Sydney Cricket Ground. His personal points tally of 26 was the club's highest since Brett Hodgson's record 30-point tally in the Wests Tigers 2005 premiership winning side.

On 30 September, Momirovski earned his first representative jersey as he was named at centre in Prime Minister's XIII

2020
During the lead up to the 2020 NRL season, the Tigers and Melbourne Storm attempted to arrange a temporary player swap between Momirovski and Storm player Harry Grant. The primary catalyst of this was Wests Tigers requiring reinforcements at Grant's preferred position of hooker due to the retirement of Robbie Farah and long term injury to Wests Tigers preferred replacement Jacob Liddle. Initially the NRL salary cap administrators refused to process the request because Melbourne would have gone over the salary cap if the deal had been processed at that time. 

There were further delays due to injury to Brandon Smith causing Melbourne to hold up proceedings so they could have Grant provide back up to Cameron Smith in the early rounds of the season, and briefly by Momirovski wishing to sign a new contract with Wests Tigers prior to leaving, but the deal was finally made official during round 2 of the season, coinciding with the announcement that Momirovski had signed a contract with Wests Tigers for the 2021, and 2022 seasons. This deal was the first of its kind in the NRL.

2021
On 7 February 2021, Momorovski signed with the Penrith Panthers in a swap deal which allowed Daine Laurie to join the Wests Tigers a year early. 
In round 1 of the 2021 NRL season, he made his debut for Penrith in a 24-0 victory over North Queensland.
In round 2, he scored two tries as Penrith defeated Canterbury-Bankstown 28-0 at Western Sydney Stadium.
In round 6, he was placed on report after a high tackle on Brisbane player Tom Dearden in Penrith's 20-12 victory.  He was later suspended for three games.
He played a total of 19 games for Penrith in the 2021 NRL season including the club's 2021 NRL Grand Final victory over South Sydney.
On 21 October, he signed a three-year deal to join the Sydney Roosters starting in the 2022 season.

2022
Momirovski played 19 games for the Sydney Roosters in the 2022 NRL season scoring six tries.  Momirovski played for the club in their elimination final loss to South Sydney.

References

External links
Penrith Panthers profile
Wests Tigers profile
Sydney Roosters profile

1996 births
Living people
Australian rugby league players
Australian people of Macedonian descent
Rugby league centres
Sydney Roosters players
Melbourne Storm players
Penrith Panthers players
Rugby league players from Sydney
Wests Tigers players
Western Suburbs Magpies NSW Cup players